Zoja Rudnova (19 August 1946 - 12 March 2014) was an international table tennis player from the former Soviet Union.

Table tennis career
From 1964 to 1976 she won several medals in singles, doubles, and team events in the Table Tennis European Championships and in the World Table Tennis Championships. She was twice European champion in women singles, three time European champion with the USSR team, once in women doubles and four times in mixed doubles. She was the first woman ever to become an absolute European champion in 1970 winning all four possible gold medals (singles, team, doubles, mixed doubles) - great feat which has only been repeated once since.

She was a member of USSR women team who won gold medal at 1969 World Championships which was the only time USSR or Russia ever won gold medal as a team (she also has team silver medal from 1967 Worlds). She also has one of only two non-team world championship gold medals in table tennis ever won by USSR or Russia - in doubles in 1969 with Svetlana Grinberg.

She also won four English Open titles.

Zoja Rudnova died on 12 March 2014, at the age of 67.

See also
 List of table tennis players
 List of World Table Tennis Championships medalists

References

Soviet table tennis players
Russian female table tennis players
1946 births
2014 deaths